Barbara D. Lampert (born April 25, 1946) is an American perennial candidate from the state of Washington. Lampert, a former nurse's aide from Spokane, has been elected a Democratic Party precinct committee officer but has not had success achieving higher office, despite running for a variety of positions 15 times from 1996 through 2011. Lampert received a B.A. degree in economics from the University of Washington.  She has said she intends to run for office until she wins, or until she reaches the age of 70 years.

References

1946 births
Living people
Politicians from Spokane, Washington
University of Washington College of Arts and Sciences alumni
Washington (state) Democrats